An ichthyolith (from Greek,  “fish“ and  ”stone”, “rock“, literally "fish-rock") is any disarticulated remains of a fish found in the fossil record, most often a scale, denticle or tooth.

The term was coined by Doyle, Kennedy and Riedel (1974) to denote 'fish skeletal debris'.

The term 'stratignathy', proposed in the same paper for the time relationships of ichthyoliths, did not gain currency.

References

Prehistoric fish
Fossil record of animals